I Nyoman Renbang (1937–2001) was an Indonesian musician, composer, teacher and instrument maker. He is considered by many ethnomusicologists as one of the most influential Balinese musicians and composers of the twentieth century (including I Nyoman Kaler, I Wayan Lotring, Gusti Putu Madia Geria, I Wayan Suweca and I Wayan Berata).

Early life
I Nyoman Rembang started his musical career when he joined the local Gambuh group in his village. At seven he was already playing gender wayang on a professional basis. At eight he began to learn to play the gamelan legong from many teachers around Badung, Bali.
In his teenage, Rembang was the most accomplished musician in Bali. It made the Bali Government offer him a job to teach the Balinese Gamelan at the Surakarta Conservatorium in Central Java. He also became a specialist of Javanese gamelan under RM Yudoprawiro, a nobleman from Surakarta Palace. He is live in Bali.

Teaching
In 1960, with the former Bali's second governor, Ida Bagus Mantra, Rembang pioneered the establishment of the Balinese Conservatorium. In 1963, Rembang resigned from the Surakarta Conservatorium and concentrated in Bali where he taught in the College of Music SMKI. He was also often invited to teach in Europe as a visiting artist, composer and performer. He was the teacher of many contemporary composers and musicians such as I Wayan Suweca  and André Éric Létourneau.

Compositions
After finishing as a teacher at Denpasar's School of Arts in the mid-1980s, he created The Bungbang gamelan, a traditional instrument made from lengths of bamboo which can produce a certain tone based on it length. To play this gamelan at least 32 musicians are required and harmonises with suling (bambo's flutes). I Nyoman Rembang created many new compositions for this ensemble. Many of them have been presented during the annual Bali Arts Festival and on several occasions in Europe, America and Asia.

References and sources
Gamelan: Indonesian Arts in America" Special issue of Ear Magazine, volume 8 number 4, September/October/November 1983
Tenzer, Michael, Balinese Music, Tuttle Publishing; Subsequent edition (August 1998),

References

1937 births
Balinese people
Indonesian Hindus
2001 deaths